Nuno Miguel Frechaut Barreto (born 24 September 1977), known as Frechaut, is a Portuguese retired footballer. A defender or midfielder, he could occupy a variety of positions.

He amassed Primeira Liga totals of 233 matches and 11 goals over the course of 13 seasons, representing in the competition Vitória de Setúbal, Boavista and Braga.

Frechaut appeared for Portugal at the 2002 World Cup.

Club career
Born in Lisbon, Frechaut emerged through Vitória de Setúbal's youth academy, making his first-team – and Primeira Liga – debut in the 1996–97 season, at the age of 19. He went on to represent Boavista F.C. until December 2004, winning the national championship for the latter in 2001 whilst appearing mainly as right back.

After a failed Russian experience with FC Dynamo Moscow, Frechaut joined S.C. Braga in January 2006. In very late August 2009, after three further full campaigns of regular use (an average of 22 games, with two UEFA Cup qualifications), he left the Minho club and Portugal, agreeing to a three-year contract with French Ligue 2 side FC Metz.

In August 2012, after appearing rarely for Associação Naval 1º de Maio in the second division, 35-year-old Frechaut returned to Boavista, reuniting with former teammate Petit at the third level team.

International career
Frechaut won 17 caps for Portugal, still as a Boavista player. The first came on 2 June 2001 in a 1–1 away draw against the Republic of Ireland, for the 2002 FIFA World Cup qualifiers.

Frechaut was part of the nation's squads at both the 2002 World Cup – where he played and started in the national side's only win in the competition, the 4–0 against Poland – and the 2004 Summer Olympics.

References

External links

1977 births
Living people
Footballers from Lisbon
Portuguese footballers
Association football defenders
Association football midfielders
Association football utility players
Primeira Liga players
Liga Portugal 2 players
Segunda Divisão players
Vitória F.C. players
Boavista F.C. players
S.C. Braga players
Associação Naval 1º de Maio players
Russian Premier League players
FC Dynamo Moscow players
Ligue 2 players
FC Metz players
Portugal youth international footballers
Portugal under-21 international footballers
Portugal international footballers
2002 FIFA World Cup players
Olympic footballers of Portugal
Footballers at the 2004 Summer Olympics
Portuguese expatriate footballers
Expatriate footballers in Russia
Expatriate footballers in France
Portuguese expatriate sportspeople in Russia
Portuguese expatriate sportspeople in France